Peter Ashton (fl. 1546), was a translator.

Ashton translated into English, in 1546, the Turcicarum rerum Commentarius of Paulus Jovius, under the title of 

In the dedicatory epistle to Sir Rafe Sadler the translator informs us that he has "studyed rather to use the most playn and famylier English speche the ether Chaucers wordes (which by reason of antiquitie be almost out of use) or els inkhorn termes (as they call them) which the common people for lacke of Latin do not understand."

Sources

16th-century English translators
English translators
Year of birth unknown
Year of death unknown
English male non-fiction writers